Sterculia stigmarota is a plant, belonging to the genus Sterculia and the family Malvaceae (previously the Sterculiaceae, now relegated to a subfamily).  This species is found only in southern Vietnam (where it is known as bảy thưa muốm quay) and there are no subspecies listed in the Catalogue of Life.

References

External links

stigmarota
Endemic flora of Vietnam